Jeremy Alexander Nowak Bolívar (born 25 March 1985) is a Venezuelan football manager.

Career
Born in Valencia, Carabobo, Nowak worked as a youth coach before becoming an assistant at Tucanes de Amazonas in 2015. On 7 September 2017, he was named manager of Segunda División side Academia Puerto Cabello, and led the side to their first-ever promotion to the Primera División.

Nowak left Academia on 29 May 2018, being subsequently replaced by Pedro Depablos. He returned to the club on 4 November 2021, being named interim manager until the end of the season, as a replacement of sacked Martín Carrillo.

References

External links

1985 births
Living people
People from Valencia, Venezuela
Venezuelan football managers
Venezuelan Primera División managers
Venezuelan Segunda División managers
Academia Puerto Cabello managers